The 1997 Kazakhstan Cup Final was the fifth final of the Kazakhstan Cup. The match was contested by Kairat and Vostok-Adil at Central Stadium in Almaty. The match was played on 26 April 1997 and was the final match of the competition.

Incident in the first final
The final took place on 25 November 1996 in Almaty at the Central Stadium, in it representatives of "Munaishy" and "Yelimay" met. Before a match both teams reported about the requirement about resignation of the president of the Football Association of the Republic of Kazakhstan (FARK) Kuralbek Ordabayev and warned that the winner will accept a Cup only in case of K. Ordabayev's resignation. In a match the victory with the score 2:1 was won by the "Yelimay" football players who came back home according to the promise without cup. These actions were interpreted as refusal of participation in the final, the result of a match was cancelled, and the new final with participation left in a semi-final Almaty "Kairat" and "Vostok-Adil" a victory in which won "Kairat" was carried out on 26 April 1997.

Background
Kairat and Vostok-Adil played the second Kazakhstan Cup Final. In the first final Kairat beat Fosfor (1992 Kazakhstan Cup Final, 5-1), and Vostok-Adil beat Aktyubinets (1994 Kazakhstan Cup Final, 1-0).

Kairat and Vostok-Adil were played three times during the season of league. On Jule 26, 1996 Kairat won the first competition to the score 1-0 in the Central Stadium. On 13 September 1996 Kairat and Vostok-Adil move ahead 3-3. In the third match Vostok-Adil beat Kairat with the score 2-0. Goals marked out Yevgeni Sveshnikov and Ruslan Duzmambetov.

Route to the Final

Kairat

Vostok-Adil

Match

Details

References

1996 domestic association football cups
1996 in Kazakhstani football
1997 domestic association football cups
1997 in Kazakhstani football
Kazakhstan Cup Finals